The Treason Act 1415 (3 Hen. 5 st.2 c.6) was an Act of the Parliament of England which made clipping coins high treason, punishable by death. (It was already treason to counterfeit coins.) The Act was repealed by the Treason Act 1553, and then revived again in 1562. The Act originally only protected English coins, but was later extended in 1575 to cover foreign coins "current" within England. By this time the Coin Act 1572 had already made it misprision of treason to clip foreign coins not current within the Realm.

Another Act in 1415, 3 Hen. 5 st.2 c.7, extended the jurisdiction to try this category of treason to all justices in the realm, instead of just the select few known as the King's justices.

The Coin Act 1575 also abolished (for coin clipping only) the penalties of corruption of blood and forfeiture of goods and lands.

See also
Coin Act 1696
High treason in the United Kingdom
Treason Act

References

Treason in England
Acts of the Parliament of England
1410s in law
1415 in England
1415
Currency law in the United Kingdom